Kfar Glikson (lit. Glickson Village) is a kibbutz in northern Israel. Located near Binyamina and Pardes Hana-Karkur, it falls under the jurisdiction of Menashe Regional Council.

History
The village was established on 23 May 1939 by Jewish immigrants from Romania as a tower and stockade settlement. It was named after Moshe Glickson, editor of Haaretz newspaper between 1922 and 1937.

The economy of Kfar Glickson is based on agriculture (field crops, dairy farm), a handicrafts industry and rural tourism. Omega, located in Kfar Glikson, manufactures paints and modelling dough for children.

References

Kibbutzim
Populated places established in 1939
1939 establishments in Mandatory Palestine
Populated places in Haifa District
Romanian-Jewish culture in Israel